Alexander Archibald Clarke (25 May 1907 – 20 June 1984) was an Australian rules footballer who played for the North Melbourne Football Club in the Victorian Football League (VFL).

Notes

External links 

1907 births
1984 deaths
Australian rules footballers from New South Wales
North Melbourne Football Club players